The following is a summary of Down county football team's 2019 season. This season marked the 25th anniversary of Down's last All-Ireland SFC win in 1994, which is also the year they last won the Ulster SFC. On 24 August 2018, Paddy Tally was announced as the new Down manager following the resignation of Éamonn Burns.

Kits

Competitions

Dr McKenna Cup
The draw for the 2019 Dr McKenna Cup was made in December 2018. It was the first time in recent history that the competition would start in the previous calendar year as the regular season, with games starting in December 2018. Down finished 3rd in the group following defeats to Cavan and Donegal.

Fixtures

Table

Reports

National Football League Division 3

Down played in Division Three of the National Football League in 2019.

Fixtures and results
Fixtures for the 2019 National League were announced on 7 September 2018.

Results by matchday

Table

Reports

Ulster Senior Football Championship

The draw for the 2019 Ulster Senior Football Championship took place on 12 October 2018.

Fixtures

Bracket

Reports

All-Ireland Senior Football Championship

Down entered the 2019 All-Ireland Senior Football Championship in Round 1 of the qualifiers. Following a win over Tipperary in Round 1 Down progressed into the 2nd round of the All Ireland qualifiers where they were defeated by Mayo bringing an end to their 2019 campaign.

Fixtures

Reports

References

Down
Gaelic
Down county football team seasons